The Deputy Chief of Staff for Intelligence, Surveillance, Reconnaissance, and Cyber Effects Operations of the United States Air Force is a position in the United States Air Force tasked with the development and implementation of policy formulation, planning, evaluation, oversight and leadership of Air Force intelligence, surveillance, reconnaissance and cyber effects operations capabilities. Commonly referred to as the A26, it is held by a lieutenant general who also serves as the representative of the Air Force to the intelligence community. The position is one of among the ten same positions in the Headquarters of the U.S. Air Force. As such, the officeholder of this position serves in the Air Staff. The current holder of this position is Lieutenant General Leah G. Lauderback.

Organization 
Deputy Chief of Staff for Intelligence, Surveillance, Reconnaissance and Cyber Effects Operations:  Lt Gen Leah G. Lauderback
Assistant Deputy Chief of Staff for Intelligence, Surveillance and Reconnaissance:  Maj Gen Daniel L. Simpson
Director of Remotely Piloted Aircraft and Airborne ISR Capabilities:  Brig Gen Stewart A. Hammons
Director of Intelligence, Surveillance, and Reconnaissance Operations:  Brig Gen Max E. Pearson
Assistant Deputy Chief of Staff for Cyber Effects Operations:  Maj Gen David W. Snoddy
Director of Cyberspace Operations and Warfighter Communications: 
Director of Electromagnetic Spectrum Superiority:

List of Deputy Chief of Staff for Operations of the United States Air Force

References

See also 
 Air Staff
 Deputy Chief of Staff for Operations of the United States Air Force
 United States Air Force

United States Air Force generals